Sobin may refer to the following places in Poland:
Sobin, Lower Silesian Voivodeship (south-west Poland)
Sobin, Warmian-Masurian Voivodeship (north Poland)

Other:
The lead singer of the pop music band Sobin a'r Smaeliaid